Steve Shehan (born 18 January 1957 in Fort Eustis, Virginia) is a French-American percussionist and music composer.

Early life
Steve Shehan was born in the United States of an American (Cherokee) father and a French mother.

Discography
Steve Shehan has collaborated with many artists through the world, such as Othmane Bali.
He is a member of the group "Hadouk Trio" together with Didier Malherbe and Loy Ehrlich.

References

1957 births
Living people
American percussionists
American male composers
21st-century American composers
21st-century American male musicians